Iss Khamoshi ka Matlab (Eng: What's the meaning of this silence?) is a Pakistani family drama television series premiered on Geo TV on 13 April 2016. It is produced by Babar Javed under A&B Entertainment.

Plot 
Is Khamoshi Ka Matlab is a family drama based on communication gap among family members. The play draws attention to a situation in which everyone in the family has personal resentments towards other family members but they never discuss it with each other.

The mother-in-law (Samina Ahmed) has several complaints from her son, Habib, (Waseem Abbas) and his wife, Salma, (Atiqa Odho) without much of a reason. She lives with her daughter, Samina, (Fazila Qazi) who also humiliates her sister-in-law for one or another reason. She only happens to make matters worse by provoking Ahmed by repeatedly reminding her of the grudges she withholds.

Encapsulated by this animosity, there is a blossoming love story between two cousins. Neither Salma’s daughter, Zainab (Aiman Khan), nor Samina’s son, Ali (Ali Ansari), has the courage to disclose their feelings to their parents in this tragic situation. Eventually, they learn that Zainab’s parents have already fixed her marriage with her maternal cousin, Noman (Asad Siddiqui). Over the time, their grudges get severe while the two love birds are left to bear severe pain that comes with the family clash.

Cast
Atiqa Odho as Salma
Waseem Abbas as Habib: Salma's husband and Zainab's father
Samina Ahmed as Habib's mother and Salma's mother-in-law
Aiman Khan as Zainab: Salma and Habib's daughter
Ali Ansari as Ali
Asad Siddiqui as Noman
Jinaan Hussain as Saima
Fazila Qazi as Salina: Habib's sister
Hina Dilpazeer
Hina Rizvi as Yasmeen
Saba Faisal
Yasra Rizvi
Shamim Hilaly as Yasmeen's aunt
Sami Sani
Azfar Ali

See also
 List of programs broadcast by Geo TV
 Geo TV
 List of Pakistani television serials

References

External links

 
A&B Entertainment
2016 Pakistani television series debuts